Abhona is a village in Kalwan tehsil of Nashik district in the Indian state of Maharashtra. It belongs to the North Maharashtra region.

Location 

Abhona is located 60 km towards north from district headquarters Nashik, 12 km from Kalwan and 240 km from state capital Mumbai. Abhona is situated 760 meters above sea level. The vegetation and cold climate of Abhona makes this place good to live in. The Saptashrungi Gad which is one of the 52 Shakti Piths in India and 3 1/2 shakti piths in Maharashtra is situated 18 km far from Abhona. The Goddess Mahishasurmardini had taken the form of Durga (the Mahalakshmi of Devi Mahatmaya) and slew the buffalo-demon Mahishasura, who troubled the universe near the Abhona.Saptashrungi gad was belongs to Abhona police station until 2015, later from 2016 it is under Kalwan police station.

The Hill Station Saputara in Gujarat state, which is the only cold climate place in that state, is only 30 km far from Abhona. Gujarat state border (Saputara) is 30 km towards Abhona. Abhona is situated on the banks of Girna river. Chankapur dam which is on Girna river is one of the biggest dam built by British in 19th century is only 3 km from Abhona. Abhona is surrounded by Baglan (Satana) tehsil towards east, Dindori taluka towards south, Surgana towards west and Dang district (Gujarat state) towards north. Malegaon, Satana, Manmad, Kalwan, Nashik are the nearby cities to Abhona. Dhodap hill fort which is 3rd highest peak in Maharashtra and one of the most popular mountain climbing destination in Maharashtra is 16 km from Abhona. Marathi is the local language in Abhona. There are many peoples from other states like Bihar, Rajasthan, UP, Madras lives in Abhona for business purpose.

Climate 
Peoples who visited Abhona likes to live for some time because of cold climate and beautiful surroundings and greate atmosphere. Abhona is a beautiful Town on the Western Ghats.

History 
Kalachuris (550–573 A.D) :The Vishnukundins were, however, ousted from Maharashtra and Vidarbha by the Kalachuri king Krishnaraja, who rose to power in about A.D. 550. He ruled from Mahishmati, modern Maheshvara, in the former Indore State. His coins have been found over a wide territory extending from Rajputana in the north to Maharashtra in the south in the village Devlana in the Baglan taluka of the Nasik district. The hoard comprised 82 coins. The coins were known as Krishnarajarupakas and have been mentioned in the Anjaneri plates dated in the year 461 of the Abhira era (corresponding to A.D. 710-11). They were therefore in circulation for at least 150 years after the time of Krishnaraja. Krishnaraja was succeeded by his son Shankaragana, whose copper plate, grant has been discovered at Abhona.

Villages in Nashik district